El Embrujo Airport  is an airport serving Providencia Island, Colombia. The airport is located in the north east side of the island, in the limits of the Old Providence McBean Lagoon National Natural Park.

The runway is on the eastern edge of the island, with high terrain to the west. Runway 17 has a  displaced threshold.

History
The airport was built in the 1970s, with small aircraft serving sporadic trips between San Andrés and Providencia Island.

Prior to 1984, the airport had limited traffic from San Andrés Airport due to its short runway.

After the upgrades, SAM Colombia began flights from San Andrés. Later, the airport was again refurbished, with improved air terminal facilities.

Airlines and destinations

Transportation

Taxi
Taxis are available at the airport meeting incoming planes. All taxis charge the same rate to any destination.

See also
Transport in Colombia
List of airports in Colombia

References

External links
OpenStreetMap - El Embrujo
OurAirports - El Embrujo
SkyVector - El Embrujo
Searca

Airports in Colombia
Buildings and structures in the Archipelago of San Andrés, Providencia and Santa Catalina
Airports with year of establishment missing